KOUI (90.7 FM) is a radio station licensed to Louisville, Mississippi, United States.  The station is currently owned by South Central Oklahoma Christian Broadcasting, Inc.

KOUI broadcasts a southern gospel format to the Louisville, Mississippi, area.

History
This station was assigned call sign KOUI on February 6, 2009.

References

External links

Southern Gospel radio stations in the United States
Radio stations established in 2009
Christian radio stations in Mississippi